Schlump. The Story of an Unknown Soldier is a 1928 semi-autobiographical novel by the German author . Published anonymously by Kurt Wolff, the book relates the experiences of its protagonist, Emil Schulz, known as "Schlump", as a military policeman in German-occupied France during World War I. The work was burnt by the Nazis in 1933 because of its satirical and anti-war tone.

History and legacy 
Although briefly acclaimed after its initial publication, the book was almost immediately eclipsed by the success of Erich Maria Remarque's All Quiet on the Western Front, published in 1929. However, it regained momentary popularity in 2013 when Grimm was identified as the author, after his granddaughter reached out to German writer and literary critic Volker Weidermann following his inclusion of the novel in his Book of Burned Books. To that end, in 2015, an English edition was published by the New York Review of Books translated by Jamie Bulloch with an editorial commentary by Weidermann. However, remarking on the novel's waning popularity in 2021, Michael Shindler in the University Bookman notes, "Probably Schlump [...] will soon join that once-celebrated epic poem of the third-century Neoplatonist Zoticus, which told of the death of Atlantis, of which every verse has sunk below the horizon of human memory."

See also
The Case of Sergeant Grischa (1927)

References

Citations

External links
Have You Read Schlump Yet? in The Paris Review

1928 German-language novels
Anti-war novels
Novels set during World War I
Novels set in Europe